Roridomyces appendiculatus is a species of fungus in the genus Roridomyces, family Mycenaceae. It is found in Europe.

References

External links

Mycenaceae
Fungi of Europe
Fungi described in 1994